French ship Union may refer to:

French ship Union (1763), a 64-gun French Navy ship of the line
French ship Union (1799), a 74-gun French Nave Téméraire-class ship of the line

Ship names